Caprichosa y millonaria (English: Capricious and millionaire) is a 1940 Argentine musical film, directed and written by Enrique Santos Discépolo. It was released on May 1, 1940.

Cast
 Paulina Singerman 
 Fernando Borel 
 Tania 
 Augusto Codecá 
 Adolfo Meyer 
 Inés Edmonson 
 Eduardo Sandrini 
 Antonio Ber Ciani 
 Raúl Valdez (actor) 
 Nacho Rosseti 
 Alberto Terrones 
 Aurelia Musto 
 Salvador Arcella 
 Isabel Luciano 
 Lola Henderson 
 Teresita Padrón 
 Tota Martínez 
 Emilia González 
 Elvira Soubrevie 
 Arnoldo Chamot 
 María Arrieta 
 José Vitori 
 Fernando Caprio 
 Barry Moral 
 Carlos Moral 
 Betty Blain 
 Víctor Debari
 Salvador Sinaí

References

1940 films
1940s Spanish-language films
Argentine black-and-white films
Argentine musical films
1940 musical films
1940s Argentine films